Derrick Anderson (born 9 May 1966) is a judoka from Guam. He competed in the men's half-lightweight event at the 1988 Summer Olympics.

References

External links
 

1966 births
Living people
Guamanian male judoka
Olympic judoka of Guam
Judoka at the 1988 Summer Olympics
Place of birth missing (living people)